Nixa can refer to:
 Nixa, Missouri, suburb of Springfield, Missouri, USA
 Nixa Records, British record label founded in 1950
 Nicholas Alexandrovich, Tsesarevich of Russia (nickname)
 , pseudonym of Nicanor de la Fuente Sifuentes (1902-2009), Peruvian writer